The Lotus T128, known prior to its launch by its project number TL11, is a Formula One motor racing car designed by Mike Gascoyne, Lewis Butler and Marianne Hinson for Team Lotus in the 2011 Formula One season. 2011 saw the car abandon its Cosworth engine in favour of one developed by Renault. The T128 was launched online on 31 January 2011. Team Lotus retained an unchanged driver lineup in 2011, with 2010 drivers Heikki Kovalainen and Jarno Trulli racing the T128. It was confirmed that the team would start the season without the Kinetic Energy Recovery System, but senior figures suggested they would adopt it if the car proved successful, however the team continued for the rest of the 2011 season without KERS. The team changed from the Cosworth CA2010 engine used in 2010 to the Renault RS27 series, as well as exchanging a transmission developed by X-Trac to one built by Red Bull Technologies. The design of the T128 also incorporated a "bladed" rollbar similar to the one developed by Mercedes in 2010, but thicker and with sturdier air intakes to conform with FIA regulations.

Pre-season 
Lotus Racing announced on 5 October 2010 that the team had agreed a deal with Red Bull Technology for the supply of gearboxes and hydraulic systems from 2011 onwards. As part of a major technical team upgrade many Force India staff were leaving their jobs to join the team and aid with car development. On 24 October 2010, the team confirmed that it will build a dedicated wind-tunnel facility at its British base. In addition, the team and its GP2 outfit Team AirAsia will expand operations at the existing factory site to take over a further two units, giving Team Air Asia a permanent home alongside the Lotus operation. On 5 November 2010, the team confirmed an engine full-works partnership for the next two years with Renault. 

On 30 November 2010, the FIA released the entry list for the 2011 season in which Lotus Racing were listed under the "Team Lotus" name. To show that the team was pressing ahead with its plans, they rebranded their factory, changed their official website and introduced a new team logo. Chief executive Riad Asmat announced that he expected the car to be a genuine midfield runner and challenge for point-scoring positions. Jarno Trulli said that the Lotus-sponsored Renault team had given Team Lotus plenty of motivation to perform more consistently.

Team Lotus skipped the first day of the Valencia test opting to carry out a private test day at the end of the week instead. It was a good call as a power steering issue dogged the car after its roll out on Wednesday.  It limited most of the test to looking at launch systems, aero testing and basic systems checks. It also meant that the team was lacking on long runs and tyre data (it was running too slowly to really work the rubber).

2011 season 
In qualifying for the first race, the Australian Grand Prix, Team Lotus were eliminated in Q1, causing surprise within the team, who had expected to be much closer to the midfield, although they were ahead of both Virgins and HRTs. in the race, Heikki Kovalainen retired on lap 19 due to a water leak, while Jarno Trulli finished 13th, ahead of d'Ambrosio.

Throughout the season, the T128 was faster than the Virgin cars and HRTs.

Complete Formula One results
(key) (results in bold indicate pole position; results in italics indicate fastest lap)

References

External links

T128